China is the debut studio album by hard rock band China, released in 1988, through record label Vertigo. The singles of this album were "Hot Lovin' Night", "Shout It Out" and "Wild Jealousy".

Track listing
All songs written by China, except "Back to You", By Fernando Von Arb, and "Intro" by Fabian Emmenegger.

Note: The original release featured only the first 11 tracks.  However, there are some versions which feature "One Shot to the Heart"  (a bonus track) as number 11, thus moving "Staying Alive" down one slot in the listing.  The same release also tacks on "Don't Look Back" as a bonus, thus allotting it two extra songs.

Personnel
Math Shiverow: Vocals
Freddy Laurence: Rhythm and lead guitar
Claudio Matteo: Rhythm and lead guitar
Marc Lynn: Bass
John Dommen: Drums, percussion

Charts

References

China (band) albums
1988 debut albums
Vertigo Records albums
Albums produced by Dirk Steffens